Michael C. Botticelli (July 10, 1959 – February 28, 2023) was an American figure skater who competed in pairs with Sheryl Franks. The couple won the bronze medal at the United States Figure Skating Championships four consecutive times, beginning in 1977, and finished seventh at the 1980 Winter Olympic Games. He coached at William L. Chase Arena.

Botticelli was born in Boston, Massachusetts, on July 10, 1959. He died on February 28, 2023, at the age of 63.

Results
(pairs with Sheryl Franks)

References

Sources
Sports-Reference.com

1959 births
2023 deaths
American male pair skaters
Figure skaters at the 1980 Winter Olympics
Olympic figure skaters of the United States
Figure skaters from Boston